Contemporary Theatre Review is a quarterly peer-reviewed academic journal published by Routledge and covering all aspects of theatre,  live art, performance art, opera, dance, digital performance, activist and applied performance, theatre design, and connections between time-based arts and visual arts. The journal was established in 1992 and the editors-in-chief are Maria M. Delgado (University of London), Maggie B. Gale (University of Manchester), and Dominic Johnson (University of London).

The journal frequently publishes special issues. Recent examples include guest-edited special issues on Tim Crouch, Martin Crimp, race and race-blind casting, performance and activism, performance and the electoral process, editing, the London 2012 Olympics, live art in the UK, and site-specificity.

As well as research articles, the journal publishes book reviews, and makes space for production notes, designs, manifestos, and interviews by emergent and established theatre-makers, which are collected in a "Documents" section. Meanwhile, the journal's "Backpages" section presents a more expansive view of theatre and performance. The journal's website offers "Interventions", responding to current developments in the field and extending discussions from the print journal through a variety of writing formats and multimedia.

Abstracting and indexing 
The journal is abstracted and indexed in the British Humanities Index, Scopus, Current Contents/Arts & Humanities, and the Arts & Humanities Citation Index.

References

External links 
 

Arts journals
English-language journals
Publications established in 1992
Taylor & Francis academic journals
Quarterly journals
Contemporary theatre